Helen Eager (born 27 September 1952, Sydney, Australia) is an Australian artist with an exhibition history of over 40 years. Her work 'Tango' was selected for the Inaugural Circular Quay Foyer Wall Commission  at the Museum of Contemporary Art Australia (MCA), Sydney in 2011. An initial temporary site-specific commission, 'Tango' is now permanently on display in a new location at MCA.  Eager's paintings, works on paper, video's and prints are held in national and state collections, including National Gallery of Australia, Art Gallery of NSW, National Gallery of Victoria and the Art Gallery of South Australia.

Education 
Eager first studied art at the South Australian School or Arts in Adelaide from 1972 to 1975. Accepting a Visual Arts Board Grant for study in Europe and United States; she studied at Kala Art Institute, from 1981 to 1982. She completed her Masters of Visual Arts at College of Fine Art, New South Wales in 1990, and an artist residency at the Greene Street Studio, New York, in 1988.

Early work 
Eager first became known for her paintings of familiar objects such as chairs, tea cups and vases.  Manipulating colour and light, "her art makes us more responsive to, and even wary of, otherwise benign interiors."

From 1988 Eager work leaned more and more to abstraction. Her compositions explore links between shapes. For ten years those shapes were triangles, although the shapes are currently multi-sided. The interplay between colour and light recurs in Eager's abstract work. Her 2021 survey of 40 years of drawing articulated these developments.

Exhibitions 

Eager held solo exhibitions at Sydney's Watters Gallery between 1977 and 1991 and Utopia Art Sydney from 2009. Other solo exhibitions were held in Brisbane, Melbourne, and Adelaide.

As a print-maker and painter, Eager has participated in numerous group exhibitions, including the Tokyo Print Biennale, Japan, 1979, and Sydney Contemporary, 2019, Carriageworks, Sydney.

References 

20th-century Australian women artists
20th-century Australian artists
21st-century Australian women artists
21st-century Australian artists
Living people
1952 births